Tessa Mittelstaedt (born 1 April 1974 in Ulm) is a German actress.  She is best known for playing the role of Franziska Lüttgenjohann in the Westdeutscher Rundfunk iteration of Tatort, alongside Klaus J. Behrendt and Dietmar Bär. She's also known for playing Andrea Junginger in the German drama TV series Der Bergdoktor from season 2 to season 4.

References

Tessa Mittelstaedt als Lilo Behringer

1974 births
Living people
German television actresses
People from Ulm
German film actresses
21st-century German actresses